Corbin is a settlement in Newfoundland and Labrador.  It was one of the last communities in Newfoundland to be resettled, having returned a population figure in 1981 but not thereafter.  A number of cabins remain however, and these are still seasonally visited.  The bridge to Corbin was earmarked for dismantlement, meaning cabin owners may find some local difficulty in reaching their summer homes.

Ghost towns in Newfoundland and Labrador